Kosigi is a village and mandal in Kurnool district of Andhra Pradesh, India. In addition to Telugu, Kannada is also spoken and understood by large number of people here. Kosigi is well connected through the Mumbai-Chennai rail route and has a railway station constructed well before independence of India. Kosigi was well known for the leather raw material (animal skin).
Kosigi Mandal has a population of 68001 of which males 34,072 and females are 33,929. Kosigi village has 23126 people according to the census 2011. Major cast in this area is VALMIKI boyas.

Geography
It has an average elevation of 398 meters (1309 feet).

References

Villages in Kurnool district